Puti is a 2012 Filipino psychological thriller film about a counterfeit painter who figures in a freak car accident that renders him color blind; while recuperating, strange things start to happen to him.

Plot
Art forger Amir (Ian Veneracion) lives like a recluse with his young son Jaime. His beloved wife died a few years ago and the rest of his family lives abroad. His social interactions are limited to his young assistant Nika (Jasmine Curtis) and his dealer, who sells his forged paintings to rich buyers. There's not a lot of joy in his life. Then Amir and his son are involved in a car crash. He wakes up in hospital and discovers that he's color blind. His son lies in a coma. To pay for Jaime's treatment, Amir has to continue working, which is anything but easy with his condition. The blind woman whose eyes were gouged out by her mother when she was a child and whom he painted just before the accident, starts appearing everywhere. Birds fly out of his canvasses, his paintings show things that weren't there before and in the hospital a mysterious nurse keeps reading the same story to Jaime.

Cast
Ian Veneracion as Amir
Jasmine Curtis as Nika
Lauren Young as Ana
Bryan Pagala as Jaime
Leo Rialp
Maricel Baluan

References

2012 films
Philippine psychological thriller films
2012 psychological thriller films
2012 thriller films